Diana Garcia or García may refer to:
 Diana García (cyclist) (born 1982), Colombian cyclist
 Diana Garcia (poet) (born 1950), American poet
 Diana García (squash player) (born 1992), Mexican squash player
 Diana García (footballer) (born 1999), Mexican footballer